Kidmi Gestet is an exclosure located in the Dogu'a Tembien woreda of the Tigray Region in Ethiopia.

Environmental characteristics
 Area: 46 ha
 Average slope gradient: 48%
 Minimum altitude: 2015 metres
 Maximum altitude: 2131 metres
 Lithology: Antalo Limestone
 2017: support by the EthioTrees project

Management
Cattle ranging and wood harvesting are prohibited in Kidmi Gestet. The grasses are harvested once yearly and taken to the homesteads of the village to feed livestock.

Benefits for the community
Setting aside such areas fits with the long-term vision of the communities: hiza’iti lands are set aside for use by the future generations. This also has direct benefits for the community, including:
 improved ground water availability
 honey production
 climate ameliorator (temperature, moisture)
 the sequestered carbon is certified using the Plan Vivo voluntary carbon standard, after which carbon credits are sold
 the revenues are then reinvested in the villages, according to the priorities of the communities; it may be for an additional class in the village school, a water pond, or conservation in the exclosures.

Biodiversity
With vegetation growth, biodiversity in this enclosure has strongly improved, showing more varied vegetation and wildlife.

References

External links
 EthioTrees on Davines website
 EthioTrees project website
 EthioTrees on Plan Vivo website
 Link For Forestry Projects

2017 establishments in Ethiopia
Land management
Environmental conservation
Greenhouse gas emissions
Emissions reduction
Carbon finance
Exclosures of Tigray Region
 
Dogu'a Tembien